Maghar or Mughar is the Arabic word for cave. It may refer to:

 Maghar (month), the Sikh calendar month
 Maghar, India, a town in Sant Kabir Nagar district in the state of Uttar Pradesh
 Mughar, Iran, a village in Isfahan Province
 Maghar, Israel, an Arab town in northern Israel
 Al-Maghar, a Palestinian village depopulated in 1948
 Battle of Mughar Ridge, in World War I
 Al-Magar, in Saudi Arabia

See also
 Magha (disambiguation)